A complete list of songs released and/or performed by the American pop band Jonas Brothers.

Performed by Jonas Brothers

Jonas songs
Songs featured in the Disney Channel original series, Jonas.

References

External links 
 Jonas Brothers complete list of songs

Jonas Brothers songs
Lists of songs recorded by American artists